Belostoma is a genus of insects in the hemipteran family Belostomatidae, known colloquially as giant water bugs. Members of this genus are native to freshwater habitats in the Americas, with the greatest species richness in tropical South America. Most species in the family Belostomatidae have historically been included in Belostoma, but several of these have been moved to other genera (although Belostoma remains a genus with many members). 9 species are claimed to be found in Northern America, but the genus Belostoma is actually divided into 16 subgroups containing about 70 species.

Habits 
The morphology and the behaviour of giant water bugs of the genus Belostoma is very similar to those of the genus Lethocerus and Abedus, which all belong to the family of the Belostomatidae. They also show breeding habits similar to those of the family of the Belostomatidae. They show paternal care. The males are carrying the eggs cemented on theirs backs, that are placed there by the females. The males carry them until the nymphs hatch.

Bugs of the genus Belostoma prefer lentic habitats with submerged or emergent vegetation and for overwintering the adults fly to ponds and slow moving waters. During the springtime und the early summer they often fly to electric light sources, so they are also named "electric light bugs". The life circle contains one generation a year. The length of the bodies is between 15 to 41,5mm.

Nymphs and adults are predators eating fish, amphians, snails and invertebrates. Sometimes small turtles and snakes also may be their prey. They stalk their prey by hanging head-downwards under the water surface striking it using the rostrum and injecting digestive saliva. The sting of these bugs may be very painful but it is harmless, but because of that fact these bugs are also called "toe biters". Encountered by larger animals they often play dead. Giant water bugs sometimes are eaten by crocodilia such as young alligators.

Species

The following species belong to the genus Belostoma: i c g b

Belostoma amazonum Estévez & J. Polhemus, 2001
Belostoma angustum Lauck, 1964
Belostoma anurum (Herrich-Schaeffer, 1848)
Belostoma asiaticum (Mayr, 1863)
Belostoma aurivillianum (Montandon, 1899)
Belostoma aztecum Lauck, 1959
Belostoma bachmanni De Carlo, 1957
 Belostoma bakeri Montandon, 1913
 Belostoma bergi (Montandon, 1899)
 Belostoma bicavum Lauck, 1964
 Belostoma bifoveolatum Spinola, 1852
 Belostoma bordoni De Carlo, 1966
 Belostoma boscii Lepeletier de Saint Fargeau & Audinet-Serville, 1825
 Belostoma bosqi De Carlo, 1932
 Belostoma cachoeirinhensis Lanzer-de-Souza, 1996
 Belostoma candidulum Montandon, 1903
 Belostoma carajaensis Ribeiro and Estévez, 2009
 Belostoma columbiae Lauck, 1962
 Belostoma confusum Lauck, 1959
 Belostoma costalimai De Carlo, 1938
 Belostoma cummingsi De Carlo, 1935
 Belostoma dallasi De Carlo, 1930
 Belostoma dentatum Mayr, 1863
 Belostoma denticolle Montandon, 1903
 Belostoma dilatatum Dufour, 1863
 Belostoma discretum Montandon, 1903
 Belostoma doesburgi De Carlo, 1966
 Belostoma elegans Mayr, 1871
 Belostoma ellipticum Latreille, 1817
 Belostoma elegans Mayr, 1871
 Belostoma elongatum Montandon, 1908
 Belostoma estevezae Ribeiro and Alecrim, 2008
 Belostoma fakir Gistl, 1848
 Belostoma fittkaui De Carlo, 1966
 Belostoma flumineum Say, 1832
 Belostoma foveolatum Mayr, 1863
 Belostoma fusciventre Dufour, 1863
 Belostoma grande Amyot & Audinet-Serville, 1843
 Belostoma gestroi Montandon, 1900
 Belostoma guianae Lauck, 1962
 Belostoma harrisi Lauck, 1962
 Belostoma hirsutum Roback and Nieser, 1974
 Belostoma horvathi Montandon, 1903
 Belostoma husseyi De Carlo, 1960
 Belostoma lariversi De Carlo, 1960
 Belostoma lutarium Stål, 1855
 Belostoma machrisi De Carlo, 1962
 Belostoma malkini Lauck, 1962
 Belostoma martinezi De Carlo, 1957
 Belostoma martini Montandon, 1899
 Belostoma menkei De Carlo, 1960
 Belostoma micantulum Stål, 1860
 Belostoma minor Palisot de Beauvois, 1820
 Belostoma minusculum Uhler, 1884
 Belostoma nessimiani Ribeiro and Alecrim, 2008
 Belostoma nicaeum Estévez and J. Polhemus, 2007
 Belostoma noualhieri Montandon, 1903
 Belostoma orbiculatum Estévez and J. Polhemus, 2001
 Belostoma oxyurum Dufour, 1863
 Belostoma parvoculum Lauck, 1964
 Belostoma parvum Estévez and J. Polhemus, 2007
 Belostoma plebejum Stål, 1860
 Belostoma porteri De Carlo, 1942
 Belostoma pseudoguianae Roback and Nieser, 1974
 Belostoma pygmeum Dufour, 1863
 Belostoma retusum Estévez and J. Polhemus, 2001
 Belostoma ribeiroi De Carlo, 1933
 Belostoma sanctulum Montandon, 1903
 Belostoma saratogae Menke, 1958
 Belostoma sattleri De Carlo, 1966
 Belostoma sayagoi De Carlo, 1966
 Belostoma stollii Amyot & Audinet-Serville, 1843
 Belostoma subspinosum Palisot, 1820
 Belostoma testaceopallidum Latreille, 1807
 Belostoma testaceum Leidy, 1847
 Belostoma thomasi Lauck, 1959
 Belostoma triangulum Lauck, 1964
 Belostoma uhleri Montandon, 1897
 Belostoma venezuelae Lauck, 1962

Data sources: i = ITIS, c = Catalogue of Life, g = GBIF, b = Bugguide.net

References

External links
 

Belostomatidae
Nepomorpha genera
Hemiptera of South America
Hemiptera of Central America
Hemiptera of North America
Taxa named by Pierre André Latreille